Sand Ridge State Forest is a conservation area located in the U.S. state of Illinois.  Containing , it is the largest state forest in Illinois.  It is located in northern Mason County.  The nearest town is Manito, Illinois, and the nearest numbered highway is U.S. Highway 136.  It is located on a low bluff, or "sand ridge", overlooking the Illinois River, hence the name.  The sand ridge is believed to be an artifact of the post-glacial Kankakee Torrent.

The Sand Ridge State Forest largely dates back to 1939, when the state of Illinois purchased parcels of submarginal sandy farmland for conservation purposes. The Civilian Conservation Corps planted pine trees on much of the land. Endemic species include the prickly pear cactus, Opuntia, more familiar to Mexicans and residents of the U.S. Southwest.   

The Sand Ridge State Forest contains the Clear Lake Site, an archeological site listed on the National Register of Historic Places.

Current status

In the 2020s, Sand Ridge is managed by the Illinois Department of Natural Resources (IDNR) as open space for active recreational purposes, especially whitetail deer hunting.  Revis Hill Prairie, also located within Mason County, is operated by IDNR as a disjunct area of Sand Ridge State Forest.  

See also
Sand Prairie-Scrub Oak State Nature Preserve

External links
Illinois DNR Sand Ridge State Forest site

1939 establishments in Illinois
Civilian Conservation Corps in Illinois
Illinois River
Illinois state forests
Protected areas established in 1939
Protected areas of Mason County, Illinois